Muthill, pronounced , is a village in Perth and Kinross, Perthshire, Scotland. The name derives from scottish gaelic Maothail meaning “soft-ground”.

The line closed between the two points on July 6, 1964 as part of the Beeching cuts.

The ancient village was once an important religious centre and the site of a Celí Dé monastery.  The church here also served for a time as a seat of the Bishops of Strathearn (later Dunblane) before the building of the cathedral at Dunblane in the 13th century.

 
The village was largely destroyed in the 1715–1716 Jacobite rising, by Jacobite troops retiring after their defeat at the Battle of Sheriffmuir, being rebuilt in the 1740s as it lay on the route of General Wade's military road through Strathearn.

Buildings

There are over a hundred listed buildings in the village.  The kirkyard  at the centre of the small town contains the ruins of an important 15th-century parish church, which incorporates an 11th-century bell-tower (originally free-standing, and comparable to, though on a smaller scale than, that incorporated into Dunblane Cathedral), built on the orders of Michael Ochiltree, Bishop of Dunblane (in the care of Historic Scotland; no entrance charge).  This is almost the only visible reminder of the ancient village. An early Christian cross-slab (perhaps 10th-11th century) and a damaged 13th-century double effigy of an Earl and Countess of Strathearn (formerly within the choir of the church) are preserved within the tower.

St James Episcopal Church dates from 1836 and is designed by R & R Dickson.

Muthill Parish church dates from 1826 and is by James Gillespie Graham.

Muthill has its own primary school while secondary school pupils attend Strathearn Community Campus in nearby Crieff.

Notable people

Rev John Barclay (1734-1798), founder of the Berean Church
John Buchanan (1855-1896), horticulturist and missionary
David Brydie Mitchell (1766-1837), American politician
Helen Gloag (1750-1790), slave consort of Mohammed ben Abdallah

Trivia

In 2011, Muthill embarked upon a Community Action Plan exercise to explore how people envisaged the development of the village.

References

External links

 Gazetteer for Scotland

Villages in Perth and Kinross